Buffalo City (East London metropolitan area), like most South African cities, uses Metropolitan or "M" routes for important intra-city routes, a layer below National (N) roads and Regional (R) roads. Each city's M roads are independently numbered.

These roads naturally interact with East London 's N and R roads. The N2 is a highway that runs from east to west through the town on its northern perimeter. It is South Africa's coastal highway linking East London to Port Elizabeth (via Grahamstown) and Durban. It intersects with the N6 coming from Bloemfontein to the north. This road changes name to the R72 and becomes a highway leading to East London's city centre, after which it veers east/west and becomes the alternative coastal road to Port Elizabeth (via Port Alfred) . The R102 roughly parallels the N2, and is co-signed with the M5, M11 and M10. The R346 runs from King William's Town and ends at the R72 just east of the town.

Table of M roads

See also 
 Numbered Routes in South Africa

References 

Roads in South Africa